Bicyclus pavonis, the rock bush brown, is a butterfly in the family Nymphalidae. It is found in Senegal, the Gambia, Mali, Guinea, Burkina Faso, Ivory Coast, Ghana, northern Nigeria, Cameroon, the Central African Republic, southern Sudan, northern Uganda, northern Ethiopia and north-western Kenya. The habitat consists of rocky outcrops in arid savanna.

The larvae feed on Sporobolus pyramidalis.

References

Elymniini
Butterflies described in 1876
Butterflies of Africa
Taxa named by Arthur Gardiner Butler